Ett mysterium is a studio album by Freda', recorded for the 2009-2010 band reunion, 16 years following the group's breakup. The album was recorded inside band guitarist Arne Johansson's studio in the town of Jönköping in Sweden, and was released in late January 2010.

Track listing
Lyrics and music: Uno Svenningsson & Arne Johansson

Äntligen här igen
Gå aldrig ensam
En dag i taget
Bäste vän
Följ ditt hjärta till slut
Så lekande lätt
Ingen annan än du
En sol på jorden
Ett mysterium
Finns det en plats för mig?

Contributors 
Uno Svenningsson
Arne Johansson
Mats Johansson

Other musicians
Philip Ekström – choir and various instruments
Kristoffer Wallman - keyboards on track 6 and 7
Mart Hallek - violins on track 4

Charts

References 

2010 albums
Freda' albums
Universal Music Group albums
Swedish-language albums